The Palm Beach Winter Club is a historic site in North Palm Beach, Florida, United States. It is located on U.S. 1. It was once the home of Sir Harry Oakes, and later became the clubhouse of the village-owned golf course. On August 1, 1980, it was added to the National Register of Historic Places. In 1984, the building was torn down.

References

External links
 Palm Beach County listings at National Register of Historic Places

National Register of Historic Places in Palm Beach County, Florida
Golf clubs and courses designed by Charles B. Macdonald
1925 establishments in Florida
Demolished buildings and structures in Florida
Buildings and structures demolished in 1984